The Mount Vernon Hospital was a health facility in Mount Vernon Road, Barnsley, South Yorkshire, England. It was managed by South West Yorkshire Partnership NHS Foundation Trust.

History
The hospital was established when a private house, previously owned by the Cooper family, was converted into a tuberculosis sanatorium in May 1915. It joined the National Health Service in 1948. Many of the older buildings were subsequently demolished and the site was redeveloped as a geriatric hospital with the new facilities being officially opened by the Princess Royal in 1961. Additional wards were added in 1974. After services had transferred to Barnsley Hospital, Mount Vernon hospital closed in December 2017. The site was subsequently sold to Orion Homes to facilitate residential development.

References

Hospitals established in 1915
1915 establishments in England
Hospital buildings completed in 1915
Hospitals in South Yorkshire
Defunct hospitals in England
Hospitals disestablished in 2017
2017 disestablishments in England
Buildings and structures in Barnsley